Dmitri Dovgalenok (Sometimes listed as Dmitry Dovgalenok, born 14 December 1971), is a Soviet-born Belarusian sprint canoeist who competed from the early 1990s to the early 2000s (decade). He was born in Minsk. Competing in two Summer Olympics, he won a gold in the C-2 500 m event at Barcelona in 1992 representing the Unified Team.

Dovgalenok also won a gold medal in the C-2 200 m event at the 1994 ICF Canoe Sprint World Championships in Mexico City.

References

1971 births
Living people
Sportspeople from Minsk
Belarusian male canoeists
Canoeists at the 1992 Summer Olympics
Canoeists at the 1996 Summer Olympics
Olympic canoeists of Belarus
Olympic canoeists of the Unified Team
Soviet male canoeists
Olympic medalists in canoeing
ICF Canoe Sprint World Championships medalists in Canadian

Medalists at the 1992 Summer Olympics
Olympic gold medalists for the Unified Team